Iardanos is a former municipality in Elis, West Greece, Greece. Since the 2011 local government reform it is part of the municipality Pyrgos, of which it is a municipal unit. The municipal unit has an area of 62.723 km2. Its seat of administration was the village Vounargo. Iardanos is enclosed by the municipal units of Amaliada to the north, and Pyrgos to the south.

Subdivisions
The municipal unit Iardanos is subdivided into the following communities (constituent villages in brackets):
Agioi Apostoloi 
Alpochori (Alpochori, Chanakia, Kapandriti)
Fonaitika 
Katsaros 
Koryfi (Koryfi, Moni Fragkopidimatos)
Prasino (Prasino, Glykorizo, Keramidia)
Vounargo 
Vrochitsa 
Xylokera

Historical population

References

See also

List of settlements in Elis

 
Populated places in Elis